Five spot may refer to:

Five Spot Café, a jazz club in New York City.
Eremalche rotundifolia (desert five spot), a flowering plant in the mallow family
Nemophila maculata (fivespot), a flowering plant in the borage family

See also
 Coccinellidae, a family of small beetles, including five spot ladybird
 Glyphidocera lactiflosella, the five-spotted glyphidocera moth
 5 (disambiguation)
 Spot (disambiguation)